This is a list of weapons used by the Slovak Army.

Small arms

Vehicles

References

Slovak Army
Slovak military-related lists